Fire, Fury, and Fun is a studio album by American jazz musician Stan Kenton and his orchestra, released on Creative World Records. Recording sessions for the album took place in Chicago on September 26/27, 1974 at Universal Recording.

Background
Up to the time of Fire Fury and Fun the band had primarily made recordings of music that were swing oriented with progressive leanings. The transition from Capitol to Creative World Records in 1970 was fraught with difficulties during a time when the music business was changing rapidly. As a viable jazz artist who was trying to keep a loyal but dwindling following, Kenton turned to arrangers such as Hank Levy to write material that appealed to a younger audience.  The first releases for the Creative World label were live concerts and Kenton had the control he wanted over content but lacked substantial resources to engineer, mix, and promote what Capitol underwrote in the past.

In June 1973 Curnow had started as the new artists and repertoire manager overseeing the whole operation of the Creative World Records.  As per Curnow himself, "That was a remarkable and very difficult time for me. I was managing (Stan's) record company with NO experience in business, writing music like mad, living in a new place and culture (Los Angeles was another world), traveling a LOT (out with the band at least 1 week a month) and trying to keep it together at home."  The Fire Fury and Fun album was an outgrowth of and designed as a showcase for several of the current soloists in the Kenton Orchestra.  The band itself had very little time to prepare the music for the sessions, but that was the norm for many recordings done by a road band such as the Kenton orchestra.

Ratings

Track listing

Personnel

Musicians
piano and leader: Stan Kenton
saxophones and flutes: Tony Campise, Rich Condit, Greg Smith, Dan Salmasian, Roy Reynolds
trumpets: John Harner, Dave Zeagler, Mike Barrowman, Tim Hagans, Kevin Jordan
trombones: Dick Shearer, Lloyd Spoon, Dave Keim, Greg Sorcsek (bass trombone)
tuba: Mike Suter
acoustic and electric bass: Mike Ross
drum set: Peter Erskine
percussion: Ramon Lopez

Production
Robert Curnow – production
Murry Allen – recording engineering
David McMacken – creative director, graphics
Robert Curnow – mix engineer

References

Bibliography

External links
 
 
 
 

Instrumental albums
1974 albums
Stan Kenton albums
GNP Crescendo Records albums